Bolshaya Dmitrovka Street is a street located in Tverskoy District of Moscow. It runs from Okhotny Ryad to Strastnoy Boulevard. The numbering of houses is carried out from Okhotny Ryad.

Etymology
The name has been known since the 14th century. The street is named in reference to the road leading to the city of Dmitrov.

Notable buildings
The House of the Unions is located on the corner of Bolshaya Dmitrovka and Okhotny Ryad streets.

References

Streets in Moscow